The 2018–19 Slovak First Football League (known as the Fortuna Liga for sponsorship reasons) was the 26th season of first-tier football league in Slovakia since its establishment in 1993.

Spartak Trnava were the defending champions after winning their first Slovak title in the previous season. Slovan Bratislava won their first title since 2014 and their record-extending ninth Slovak league title overall.

Teams
12 teams competed in the league – the top 11 sides from the 2017–18 season and one promoted team from the 2. liga. The promoted team was Sereď. They replaced Tatran Prešov.

 FC Spartak Trnava
 ŠK Slovan Bratislava
 FC DAC 1904 Dunajská Streda
 MŠK Žilina
 AS Trenčín
 MFK Ružomberok
 FC Nitra
 MFK Zemplín Michalovce
 ŽP Šport Podbrezová
 FC ViOn Zlaté Moravce
 FK Senica
 ŠKF iClinic Sereď

Stadiums and locations

Managerial changes

Personnel and kits

Regular stage

League table

Results
Each team plays home-and-away against every other team in the league, for a total of 22 matches played each.

Championship group

Relegation group

Europa League play-offs
Should one of the top 3 teams have won the 2018–19 Slovak Cup, Europa League qualification playoffs would have been held among the 4th, 5th, 6th team in the championship group and the top team of the relegation round. The 4th team played the top team of the relegation group and the 5th played the 6th in the semifinals. Winners of the semifinals would play the final to determine the Europa League qualification spot. Europa League qualification playoff games would be one-leg and played at the home pitch of the higher-ranked team. The winners would qualify for the first qualifying round of the 2019–20 UEFA Europa League. On 1 May 2019, Spartak Trnava, who didn't qualify for the championship group, won the cup, thus eliminating the need of playoffs.

Relegation play-offs
Team placed 11th in the relegation match faced 2nd team from 2. Liga 2018–19 for one spot in the next season.

All times are CEST (UTC+2).

First leg

Second leg

''4–3 on aggregate.

Season statistics

Top goalscorers

a Included 1 play-off goal

Top assists

Hat-tricks

Clean sheets

Discipline

Player

Most yellow cards: 13

 Ľubomír Michalík (Sereď)

Most red cards: 2
 Macdonald Ngwa Niba (Nitra)
  Yani Urdinov (Ruzomberok)
  Ivan Diaz (Žilina)
 Erik Grendel (Trnava)

Club

Most yellow cards: 87
ŠKF Sereď

Most red cards: 5
AS Trenčín

Awards

Player of the Month

Top Eleven
Source:
Goalkeeper:  Dominik Greif (ŠK Slovan)
Defence:  Erick Davis (DAC D.Streda),  Kristián Koštrna (DAC D.Streda),  Dominik Kružliak (Ružomberok),  Vasil Bozhikov (ŠK Slovan)
Midfield:  Miroslav Káčer (Žilina),  Marin Ljubičić (DAC D.Streda/Slovan),   Zsolt Kalmár (DAC D.Streda),  Aleksandar Čavrić (ŠK Slovan),  Moha (ŠK Slovan)
Attack:  Andraž Šporar (ŠK Slovan)

Top Eleven U-21
Source:
Goalkeeper:   Dominik Greif (ŠK Slovan)
Defence:  Lazarus Rota (Michalovce),  Dominik Kružliak (Ružomberok),  Matej Oravec (Trnava/Podbrezová),  Branislav Sluka (MŠK Žilina)
Midfield:  Tihomir Kostadinov (Ružomberok),  Miroslav Káčer (MŠK Žilina),  Máté Vida (DAC D.Streda),  Christián Herc (DAC D.Streda)
Attack:   Tomáš Vestenický (Nitra),  Róbert Boženík (MŠK Žilina)

Individual Awards

Manager of the season

Martin Ševela (ŠK Slovan)

Player of the Year

Andraž Šporar (ŠK Slovan)

Young player of the Year

Róbert Boženík (MŠK Žilina)

See also
2018–19 Slovak Cup
2018–19 2. Liga (Slovakia)
 List of transfers summer 2018
 List of transfers winter 2018-19
 List of foreign players

References

External links

Slovak
2018-19
1